David P. Fialkow (born October 18, 1958) is an American venture capitalist and an award-winning documentary filmmaker and producer. He is the co-founder of General Catalyst, a venture capital firm focused on early-stage and growth investments. He is also a producer of the Academy Award-winning documentary Icarus.

Early life and education
David Fialkow was born in Boston, Massachusetts, and attended Buckingham Browne & Nichols School in Cambridge. Fialkow then attended Colgate University, where he earned a B.A. in fine arts, with a concentration in film.

Fialkow graduated from Colgate in 1981. He took a year off to travel and run a T-shirt business before entering law school. He earned a J.D. degree from Boston College in 1985.

Career

Early career 
Fialkow met fellow General Catalyst Co-Founder Joel Cutler, with whom he would launch a number of successful businesses, at a summer camp in Maine. While an undergraduate at Colgate, Fialkow started a successful T-shirt business. In 1987, while still in law school, he also co-founded Last-Minute Travel Company (later changed to National Leisure Group), which offered discounted vacations for individuals with flexible schedules. By the time of its sale in 1995, Last-Minute Travel was the third-largest vacation package provider in the United States.

Among other jobs that he held while in undergraduate and law school, Fialkow worked as a driver for leveraged buyout pioneer Thomas H. Lee. After graduation, Fialkow worked as an associate at Lee's eponymous firm as well as U.S. Venture Partners. Along with Cutler, he also founded a number of applied technology-based platforms and tools for the travel, financial services, specialty retail, and payment processing industries. In addition to National Leisure Group, these included:

 Alliance Development Group, sold to MyPoints.com
 Retail Growth ATM Systems, sold to PNC Bank
 Starboard Cruise Services, sold to LVMH

General Catalyst 
Fialkow co-founded General Catalyst with Cutler in Cambridge in 2000.

In 2017, Fialkow was added to the Forbes Midas List and was named one of the "Most Influential People in Boston" by Boston Magazine in 2018.

Board memberships 
Fialkow has been a member of the Board of Directors of the Boston Beer Company, the second-largest craft brewery in the United States, since 2016. He is also a member of the Dean's advisory council at the MIT School of Engineering and the Chairman of the Investment Advisory Committee at The Engine, MIT's early-stage venture capital firm.

Fialkow's former board seats include Grain Communications Group, BBN Technologies, CLEAResult, Retail Convergence and Vitrue.

Documentary filmmaking 
Fialkow first studied film at Colgate University. While attending Colgate, Fialkow participated in the university's Global Study program, where he focused on making films. Following the end of the program, he earned a grant to continue making films on his own. After graduation, Fialkow continued to produce documentary films as a hobby.

David and his wife, Nina, also an independent producer who has worked for Boston PBS affiliate WGBH-TV, are members of Impact Partners, a film partnership focused on developing films with a social justice theme.

Icarus 
David, a cycling enthusiast who sits on the board of the Pan-Mass Challenge charity bike-a-thon, was a producer of the 2017 documentary film Icarus, which chronicled director Bryan Fogel's exploration of the underground world of doping in the world of cycling. The film chronicles Fogel's use of performance-enhancing drugs to win an amateur cycling race and his discovery of a major international scandal, involving Grigory Rodchenkov, the head of the Russian anti-doping laboratory.

The film premiered at the Sundance Film Festival on January 20, 2017 and was awarded the U.S. Documentary Special Jury Award (Orwell Award). Netflix acquired the distribution rights for the film and released the documentary globally on August 4, 2017. Icarus won the Oscar for the Best Documentary Feature at the 90th Academy Awards.

Fogel said of Fialkow's contributions to the film:So often, the financier is looking over your shoulder. David is somebody who empowers people to do their best work and he’s someone who’s going to fight for you. You don’t get that every day in this business. In fact, you don’t get that any day. He’s truly inspiring and one of a kind.

Filmography 
Following the commercial and financial success of Icarus, both David and Nina have remained active as filmmakers.  The pair have worked on a number of projects, include co-producing The Fourth Estate, a four-part miniseries that chronicled The New York Times' coverage of the White House. The series, which originally aired on Showtime, was nominated for Outstanding Documentary or Nonfiction Series at the 70th Primetime Emmy Awards.

Fialkow's film credits include:

Philanthropy 
David Fialkow served as the chairman of the Pan-Mass Challenge, a 100-plus mile bike-a-thon that benefits the Dana-Farber Cancer Institute. In 2019, the organization raised $63 million for the institute.

His non-profit involvement also includes:

 Leadership Council, Facing History and Ourselves
Board of Trustees, MV Youth 
Board of Trustees, Boys and Girls Club of Boston
Member, Council on Foreign Relations

References

1958 births
Living people
American venture capitalists
Colgate University alumni
Boston College Law School alumni
American documentary film producers
Producers of Best Documentary Feature Academy Award winners